In organic chemistry, Eschenmoser's salt (named for Albert Eschenmoser) is the ionic, organic compound .  It is the iodide salt of the dimethylaminomethylene cation .

The dimethylaminomethylene cation is a strong dimethylaminomethylating agent, used to prepare derivatives of the type .  Enolates, silyl enol ethers, and even more acidic ketones undergo efficient dimethylaminomethylation.  Once prepared, such tertiary amines can be further methylated and then subjected to base-induced elimination to afford methylidenated ketones. The salt was first prepared by the group of Albert Eschenmoser after whom the reagent is named.

Structure and bonding
Dimethylaminomethylene cation is described as a resonance hybrid of the carbocation and an iminium cation:
(CH3)2N-CH2+  <=>  (CH3)2N+=CH2
The  atoms are coplanar.  The cation is isoelectronic with isobutene.

Preparation
Pyrolysis of iodomethyltrimethylammonium iodide affords the desired salt:
[(CH3)3N-CH2I]I  ->  [(CH3)2NCH2]I  +  CH3I
An alternative route starts with bis(dimethylamino)methane:
[(CH3)2N]2CH2  +  (CH3)3SiI -> [(CH3)2NCH2]I +  (CH3)3SiN(CH3)2

Related salts
Other salts of the dimethylaminomethylene cation: 
Dimethyl(methylidene)ammonium trifluoroacetate.
Dimethyl(methylidene)ammonium chloride (Böhme's salt, after Horst Böhme)

See also
 Vilsmeier reagent, .

References

Reagents for organic chemistry
Iodides
Quaternary ammonium compounds